"Breathe" is a song recorded by South Korean singer G-Dragon, released as the second single from his debut album, Heartbreaker.  While the single did not chart as high as its predecessor, it still reached the top 20 of the Korean music chart.

Release
Amid controversy of the singer's previous single being accused of plagiarism, G-Dragon quickly released his follow-up single, "Breathe," to promote his album. The song managed to chart within the Top 20 of the Korean music chart.  The lyrics, which portray the singer not wanting to wake up from a dream, was complimented by a writer for the Newsen as "strong" and "impressive."

Track listing
"Breathe"  – 3:43

Music video

Similar to "Heartbreaker"s music video, "Breathe" showcased the singer dancing against a white backdrop. The video itself was given a 20-second teaser at the end of "Heartbreaker"s music video before its official release. At the end of the music video, a short teaser of his next song "A Boy" is shown. The video has drawn over 14 million views on YouTube.

Controversy

While performing the song "Breathe" at his Shine a Light concert, G-Dragon was alleged to have "made sexually provocative gestures" when he reportedly grinded against his dancer against a propped-up bed. The Korean Ministry of Health, Welfare and Family Affairs later asked the government prosecutors to investigate if G-Dragon or YG Entertainment violated laws on obscene performances at his concert. He was found innocent and was cleared of all charges on March 15, 2010.

References

External links
 Official Website

2009 singles
Korean-language songs
G-Dragon songs
YG Entertainment singles
2009 songs
Songs written by G-Dragon
Songs written by Jimmy Thörnfeldt